Indrapur may refer to:
 Indrapur, Bheri - A city in the Banke District of Nepal.
 Indrapur, Koshi - A city in the Morang District of Nepal.